Coleophora leucopodella is a moth of the family Coleophoridae. It is found in Libya.

References

leucopodella
Endemic fauna of Libya
Moths described in 1930
Moths of Africa